Shohada is the plural form of Shahid, meaning Martyr. It may refer to:
Shohada, Fars, a village in Iran
Shohada, Lorestan, a village in Iran
Shohada, Yazd, a village in Iran
Shohada Metro Station, in Tehran
Shohada Mosque, in Tabriz, Iran
Shohada square project, in Mashhad, Iran
Shohada Stadium, a multi-purpose stadium in Noshahr, Iran
Shohada Rural District (disambiguation)

See also
Al Shohada (disambiguation)